Joshua Johnson  was an American painter from the Baltimore area of African and European ancestry. Johnson is known for his naïve paintings of prominent Maryland residents.

Life

It was not until 1939 that the identity of the painter of elite 19th-century Baltimoreans was discovered by art historian and genealogist J. Hall Pleasants, who believed that thirteen portraits were painted by one Joshua Johnson. Pleasants attempted to put the puzzle of Johnson's life together; however, questions on Johnson's race, life dates and even his last name (Johnson or Johnston) remained up until the mid-1990s, when the Maryland Historical Society released newly found manuscripts regarding Johnson's life.

Documents dated from July 25, 1782, state that Johnson was the "son of a white man and a black slave woman owned by a William Wheeler, Sr." His father, George Johnson (also spelled Johnston in some documents) purchased Joshua, age 19, from William Wheeler, a small Baltimore-based farmer, confirmed by a bill of sale dating from October 6, 1764. Wheeler sold Johnson the young man for £25, half the average price of a male slave field hand at the time. The documents state little of Joshua's mother, not even her name, and she may have been owned by Wheeler, whose own records stated that he owned two female slaves, one of whom had two children.

A manumission was also released, in which George Johnson acknowledged Joshua as his son, also stating that he would agree to free Joshua under the conditions that he either completed an apprenticeship with Baltimore blacksmith William Forepaugh or turned 21, whichever came first. The manumission was signed and confirmed by justice of the peace Colonel John Moale who would, during 1798–1800, commission Joshua to paint a portrait of his wife and granddaughter, Mrs. John Moale and Her Granddaughter, Ellin North Moale (illustrated at left).

Freedom

Johnson received his freedom in 1782 and began advertising, identifying himself as a portrait painter and limner as of 1796. He moved frequently, residing often where other artists, specifically chair-makers, lived, which suggests that he may have provided extra income for himself by painting chairs.  His frequent moving also may suggest that he tended to work for clients near whom he lived. No records mention educational or creative training and it still has not been proven that he had any type of relationship with artists such as the Peale family, Ralph Earl, or Ralph Earl Jr.

Catholic Church records show that in 1785 he married his first wife, Sarah, with whom he had four children – two sons and two daughters, the latter of whom both died young. By 1803 he was married to a woman named Clara. According to the Baltimore city directory of 1817–1818 he was listed in the section "Free Householders of Colour"; in 1825 he had moved to Frederick County, Maryland, and two years later moved to Anne Arundel County, again, following the paths of those whose portraits he painted. Little is known of his life after this final move, and his death.

Artistic career and style

Style

Recent research has brought to light that Johnson was not associated with the Peale family; however, his work is still associated with names such as Charles Peale Polk, whose naive painting and less sophisticated work (compared to his other family members) is similar to Johnson's. In his advertisement in the Baltimore Intelligencer of December 19, 1798, Johnson called his portraiture the work of "a self-taught genius, deriving from nature and industry his knowledge of the Art."

His work, however, is more similar to lesser known limners who worked during the same time in the mid-Atlantic region such as: John Drinker, Frederick Kemmelmeyer, Jacob Frymire and Caleb Boyle. In fact, Johnson may have been more than familiar with the work of these artists than previously thought; in 1818 he was commissioned by patron Rebecca Myring Everette to copy Boyle's 1807 portrait of her husband, Thomas Everett.

Johnson's work has also been compared to Ralph Earl, who, like Johnson, also utilized brass upholstery tacks, swagged curtains and open window vistas in his paintings. However, a stronger comparison lies between Johnson and Earl's son, Ralph Eleaser Whiteside Earl.  Both were noted for painting multi-figure family group portraits, which were rare during this period of American art. Both are considered prominent self-taught "folk" artists, but it can only be theorized whether the two ever came into contact within similar circles.

The Westwood Children
 In his painting The Westwood Children (now in the National Gallery of Art), Johnson depicts the male children of Margaret and John Westwood, who was a successful Baltimore stagecoach manufacturer. The painting is stylized and depicts the three children holding flowers in their hands, accompanied by the family dog which holds a bird in its mouth. The children have chilled expressionless stares, although the youngest child seems to be on the verge of smiling.

References

External links

 The Westwood Children. The National Gallery of Art. Retrieved 2004-05-15
 Selections of nineteenth-century Afro-American Art, an exhibition catalog from The Metropolitan Museum of Art (fully available online as PDF), which contains material on Joshua Johnson (no. 5)
 Charles Herman Stricker Willmans, c. 1804, Baltimore Museum of Art
 Johnson, Joshua - "Artist Info"  National Gallery of Art

1763 births
1832 deaths
Artists from Baltimore
Painters from Maryland
18th-century American painters
18th-century American male artists
American male painters
19th-century American painters
American portrait painters
18th-century American slaves
African-American painters
19th-century American male artists